Celina Márquez (born 16 July 1999) is a Salvadoran swimmer. She competed in the women's 50 metre backstroke event at the 2017 World Aquatics Championships. She competed at the 2020 Summer Olympics.

References

External links
 

1999 births
Living people
Salvadoran female swimmers
Place of birth missing (living people)
Female backstroke swimmers
Swimmers at the 2020 Summer Olympics
Olympic swimmers of El Salvador
21st-century Salvadoran women